He Jinming (born November 1968) is a former Chinese politician, and former Communist Party Secretary of Dexing, a county-level city in Jiangxi province. He was investigated for corruption in 2014, tried and convicted on charges of bribery, and sentenced to eleven years in prison.

Life
He was born and raised in Shangrao, Jiangxi. He entered Shangrao Normal University in September 1985, majoring in history, where he graduated in August 1988. After graduation, he taught at Fenglingtou High School.

He worked as a local officer in the Government of Shangrao County from 1990 to 2006.

In January 2006, He was promoted to become the CPC Party Vice-Chief and County Mayor of Hengfeng County, a position he held until May 2010, when he was transferred to Dexing and appointed the CPC Party Vice-Chief and Mayor. In May 2011, he was elevated to the CPC Party Chief of Dexing.

On June 4, 2014, He was placed under investigation by the Shangrao Municipal Discipline Inspection Commission for "serious violations of laws and regulations". The internal party investigation concluded that he took bribes, abused power, and committed adultery; he was promptly expelled from the Communist Party of China and his case moved to criminal prosecution. He was tried at the Intermediate People's Court in Jingdezhen on charges of bribery. In June 2015, he was convicted of taking bribes worth some 2.49 million yuan, and sentenced to eleven years in prison.

References 

1968 births
Living people
People's Republic of China politicians from Jiangxi
Political office-holders in Jiangxi
Chinese Communist Party politicians from Jiangxi
Politicians from Shangrao